Leonard James Gardner (1927 – 3 August 1990) was an Australian rules football player and umpire.

Playing career
He was a member of East Perth's 1944 premiership-winning team.

Umpiring career
In 1952 he was nominated as a WANFL umpire and began officiating the same year.

He was smuggled out of the ground by police.

He took charge of four WANFL grand finals, in 1956, 1958, 1960 and 1961.

References

1927 births
East Perth Football Club players
West Australian Football League umpires
1990 deaths
Date of birth missing
Australian rules footballers from Western Australia